Mark C. Smith (September 10, 1940 – March 27, 2007) was the founder and chief executive officer of ADTRAN.

Early life and education
While still in high school, Smith won a science fair at age 16 and met renowned rocket scientist Wernher Von Braun in Huntsville, Alabama. He received an electrical engineering degree from Georgia Tech in 1962.

Career
Mark C. Smith moved to Huntsville, where he founded two successful companies, the earlier being modem manufacturer Universal Data Systems in 1969. Smith went on to co-found ADTRAN in 1986 with Lonnie S. McMillian. As of 2007 the company had a market-cap of $1.7 billion. Smith retired from ADTRAN in September 2005.

Death and legacy
Mark Smith and his wife Linda were known for their philanthropic support of causes in the Huntsville area including the University of Alabama in Huntsville and the Huntsville Symphony Orchestra.

He died in 2007 due to complications from pneumonia.

References

1940 births
2007 deaths
American chief executives
Businesspeople from Birmingham, Alabama
Georgia Tech alumni
20th-century American businesspeople